Hu Ting-ting or Judy Hu (born 11 September 1979) is an England-born Taiwanese actress.

Biography

She was born in Oxford and moved to Taiwan at the age of 6, and later with her parents moved to the United States for high school and college. She went to Duke University gaining a B.A. degree in Public Policy Studies, and studied her master's degree at the University of Oxford.

She is the daughter of politician Jason Hu and actress Shirley Shaw. She made her debut performance in Bridget Jones: The Edge of Reason as a Thai prostitute.

She married Julio Acconci in January 2013 and divorced him in January 2014. She later married her long-term friend, Adam, on June 21, 2016.

Filmography

References

External links
 

1979 births
Living people
People from Oxford
Taiwanese film actresses
Sanford School of Public Policy alumni
Taiwanese television actresses
Alumni of the University of Oxford